Sympistis iricolor is a species of moth in the family Noctuidae (the owlet moths).

The MONA or Hodges number for Sympistis iricolor is 10092.

References

Further reading

 
 
 

iricolor
Articles created by Qbugbot
Moths described in 1888